Nicolas Taravel (born 13 October 1994) is a French professional footballer who currently plays for FK Sūduva as a defender.

Professional career
A youth product of Dijon FCO, Taravel spent his early career abroad with Dinamo Zagreb II in Croatia and Pafos FC in Cyprus. He joined Grenoble Foot 38 on 26 July 2018. Taravel made his professional debut with Grenoble in a 2–1 Coupe de la Ligue loss to Metz on 14 August 2018. He also scored in his Ligue 2 debut with Grenoble in a 4–2 win over Valenciennes FC on 14 September 2018.

On 24 January 2019, Taravel moved to the United States when he joined second-tier USL Championship side Oklahoma City Energy.

In July 2021 he signed with Lithuanian FK Sūduva.

Personal life
Taravel is the younger brother of Jérémy Taravel, who is also a professional footballer.

References

External links
 
 GF28 Profile
 

1994 births
Living people
Sportspeople from Nogent-sur-Marne
French footballers
Association football defenders
Grenoble Foot 38 players
OKC Energy FC players
USL Championship players
Pafos FC players
Ligue 2 players
Cypriot First Division players
Championnat National 3 players
French expatriate footballers
French expatriate sportspeople in Croatia
French expatriate sportspeople in Cyprus
Expatriate footballers in Croatia
Expatriate footballers in Cyprus
Footballers from Val-de-Marne